Morphemization is a term describing the process of creating a new morpheme using existing linguistic material. While one source cites "Eric B." as the first person who coined the term, another holds that the term had already been used by Shirley Silver, though the meaning is different from Eric's. Silver used the term for fused words, or for phrasal words like "La Brea Tar Pits" as a proper noun.

The term is also used by some Korean linguists, e.g., Lee 1998  and Kim 2010  who has coined the term in order to capture the common phenomena between grammaticalizations and lexicalisations, i.e., to capture the phenomena that result in new morphemes via reanalysis, fusion, coalescence, univerbation etc.(cf. Brinton and Traugott 2005 ). In addition to traditional examples of grammaticalization (for example, 'wanna' from 'want to' or 'gonna' from 'going to', etc.), traditional examples of lexicalization (for example, 'forever' from 'for ever', 'nonetheless' from 'non the less', etc.) make new morphemes. A very clear reason that those lexemes are not analyzable into smaller pieces is that the sum of those pieces from any of the lexemes wouldn't equal to the original meaning. These processes may be called 'morphemizations'.

Recently, the term 'morphemization' is also used to indicate morphologization in Chinese linguistics, e.g., Chen(2010). Since morphologization is a subcategory of grammaticalization, and well-known, in this case the term 'morphologization' might be better.

References

See also
 Grammaticalization

Linguistic morphology